Alro may refer to:

 Alrø, small Danish island in Horsens Fjord
 Alro Slatina, the biggest aluminium company in Romania
 AS Alro Slatina, professional football club from Slatina, Romania